Sauron is a fictional character from J.R.R. Tolkien's Middle-earth fantasy writings, and the title of one of the three games in the board game Middle Earth based on the character.

Sauron may also refer to:

Fiction
Sauron (comics), a character in the Marvel Comics universe
Dictator Sauron, a character in the game Steel Empire
Sauron, a Tyrannosaurus character in the game Primal Rage
Sauron, a character in Captain Power and the Soldiers of the Future
Sauron, a robot from the webcomic Anima: Age of the Robots
Sauron, a planet in the CoDominium (book series) universe
Sauron, a planet in the game Escape Velocity (video game)

Other uses
Sauron (game), a 1977 board wargame
Sauron (spider), a genus of spiders in the family Linyphiidae
Wojciech Wąsowicz, known as Sauron, the ex-vocalist from the Polish death metal band Decapitated
SAURON, an astronomical instrument mounted on the William Herschel Telescope
Project Sauron, malware

See also
Eye of Sauron (disambiguation)